This article is a list of U.S. states with firearm death rates per 100,000 population.

National statistics 
In 2020, over 45,000 people in the United States (13.6 per 100,000 people) died by firearms. More than half of these people died by suicide. According to the FBI's 2020 Uniform Crime Report, the total number of murders increased by nearly one-third from 2019 to 2020. In both years, three-quarters of these murders were committed with firearms; that percentage slightly increased from 2019 (74%) to 2020 (77%).

In 2017 and 2018, of all trauma-based deaths in the United States (including car crashes), firearm deaths caused the greatest loss of "years of potential life," a unit of measurement that considers each person's age at death.

2020 firearm death rates by state. Map  

Includes suicides. State abbreviations on the map are explained in the table in the next section.

2019 firearm death rates and counts by state. Table and map  
Includes suicides, too.

* below indicates "Crime in STATE" links.

Murders 

This is a list of the U.S. states and the District of Columbia. The population data is the official data from the U.S. Census Bureau. The murder rates and gun murder rates were calculated based on the FBI reports. The official population of each state for 2010 and gun ownership rates were added for context.

The gun murders in 2010 from FBI Uniform Crime Reporting (UCR) program was 8,775. The total number of murders from all weapons was 12,996. These figures includes murders and willful manslaughters, but excludes "deaths caused by negligence, suicide, or accident" and justifiable homicides. The U.S. reports a 70% conviction rate for murder prosecutions.

See also 

 Crime and violence in Latin America
 Gun laws in the United States by state
 Gun politics in the United States 
 Gun violence in the United States by state
 Suicide in the United States
 Homicide in world cities 
 Index of gun politics articles
 List of Brazilian states by murder rate
 List of cities by murder rate
 Percent of households with guns by country
 List of countries by firearm-related death rate
 List of countries by intentional death rate - homicide plus suicide.
 List of countries by intentional homicide rate by decade
 List of countries by intentional homicide rate
 List of countries by life expectancy
 List of countries by suicide rate
 List of federal subjects of Russia by murder rate
 List of Mexican states by homicides
 List of U.S. states by homicide rate
 List of U.S. states by incarceration rate
 List of United States cities by crime rate (2012). 250,001+
 Number of guns per capita by country
 Right to keep and bear arms in the United States
 United States cities by crime rate (100,000–250,000)
 United States cities by crime rate (60,000-100,000)

References

 
Homicide statistics
Suicides in the United States
Lists of states of the United States
United States demography-related lists
Health in the United States
Death in the United States-related lists